Aldein is a comune (municipality) in South Tyrol in northern Italy, located about  south of the city of Bolzano.
 
Aldein borders the following municipalities: Bronzolo, Montan, Deutschnofen, Auer, Truden and Ville di Fiemme. It contains the frazione (subdivision) Radein (Redagno).

History 

A settlement called Aldinum is mentioned for the first time in 1177, in 1185 the name appears as Alden.

Coat-of-arms
The coat of arms is divided party per fess; on the top are two quarter-circle, azure on argent background that represents the Weisshorn. The lower part shows the argent cross of Saint Andrew shortened that represent the four original hamlets on a gules background as the mountain of porphyrite. The arms were adopted in 1969.

Linguistic distribution
According to the 2011 census, 98.07% of the population speak German, 1.74% Italian and 0.19% Ladin as first language.

References

External links

Official website  

Municipalities of South Tyrol
Articles which contain graphical timelines